The Shan State langur (Trachypithecus melamera) is a species of primate in the family Cercopithecidae. It is found in eastern Myanmar and southwest China.  It had been generally considered a subspecies or even a synonym of Phayre's leaf monkey (T. phayrei) until Roos, et al., elevated it to species status in 2020.

References

Trachypithecus
Mammals of Myanmar
Mammals of China
Primates of Southeast Asia
Taxa named by Daniel Giraud Elliot
Taxobox binomials not recognized by IUCN
Mammals described in 1909